Okoli Chukwuka (born ) is a Nigerian male weightlifter, competing in the 94 kg category and representing Nigeria at international competitions. He won the bronze medal in the snatch at the 2007 All-Africa Games, lifting 146 kg. He participated at the 2010 Commonwealth Games in the 94 kg event.

Major competitions

References

1980 births
Living people
Nigerian male weightlifters
Weightlifters at the 2010 Commonwealth Games
Commonwealth Games competitors for Nigeria
Place of birth missing (living people)
African Games bronze medalists for Nigeria
African Games medalists in weightlifting
Competitors at the 2007 All-Africa Games